Forest Green Rovers Football Club is an English football club based in Nailsworth, Gloucestershire. The club is affiliated to the Gloucestershire County FA.

Early history
Forest Green Rovers was founded in October 1889 by the local Nonconformist church minister. In 1894 Forest Green Rovers became founder members of the "Mid Gloucestershire League", the first association football league in the county outside Bristol. After MGL folding in 1902, Forest Green become members of the newly formed Stroud League and also members of the Dursley and District League which they won in 1903, the club's first silverware. The Rovers first team competed in two leagues almost every season from 1900 until 1922 and again from 1928 until 1937. (This was quite common with leagues generally not having as many teams as those today).

After a break for the Great War, Rovers enjoyed a period of great success winning two football leagues and three cups in both 1921 and 1922. They then joined the newly formed Gloucestershire Northern Senior League with Cheltenham Town among others in 1922.

Rovers joined the newly formed County League in 1968 and played under manager Peter Goring, (the ex-Arsenal number 6), for the next 11 years moving up again to the Hellenic League in 1975 under Peter's stewardship.

Key

Key to league record
 Level = Level of the league in the current league system
 Pld = Games played
 W = Games won
 D = Games drawn
 L = Games lost
 GF = Goals for
 GA = Goals against
 GD = Goals difference
 Pts = Points
 Position = Position in the final league table
 Top scorer and number of goals scored shown in bold when he was also top scorer for the division. Number of goals includes goals scored in play-offs.

Key to cup records
 Res = Final reached round
 Rec = Final club record in the form of wins-draws-losses
 PR = Preliminary round
 QR1 (2, etc.) = Qualifying Cup rounds
 G = Group stage
 R1 (2, etc.) = Proper Cup rounds
 QF = Quarter-finalists
 SF = Semi-finalists
 F = Finalists
 A (QF, SF, F) = Area quarter-, semi-, finalists
 W = Winners

Seasons
List of Forest Green Rovers seasons starting since their moving to Hellenic League in 1975.

* – two points for win.

Overall Stats

* – two points for win.

First squad players
Eleven players who have the greatest number of league appearances in first team squad.

References

English football club seasons